George Davis Moore (September 19, 1867 – December 12, 1947) was an American brigadier general during World War I.

Early life and education 

George Davis Moore was born on September 19, 1867, in Illinois.  Moore attended the United States Military Academy at West Point, graduating with the class of 1890.

Career 

Moore accepted a commission in the 18th Infantry.

During the Spanish-American War, he served as a major with the Fifth Missouri Infantry.

He went to France with the American Expeditionary Force.

Moore was promoted to brigadier general on October 1, 1918.  He was the commanding general of the 169th Infantry Brigade, and participated in engagements on the Hindenburg Line, at Bellecourt and Nauroy, at Brancourt, Premont, Bassigny, Vaux-Andigny, St. Soulet, Selle River, and Mazingheim.

Moore returned to Camp Upton, New York, and commanded the 152nd Depot Brigade until May 15, 1919.

Moore retired in 1931.

Death and legacy 

Moore died on December 12, 1947.

References 

1867 births
1947 deaths
People from Illinois
United States Military Academy alumni
American military personnel of the Spanish–American War
United States Army generals of World War I
United States Army generals